James H. Ritchie Jr. is a Republican member of the South Carolina Senate, representing the 13th District since 2000. He lost to Shane Martin in the June 10th, 2008 primary election, 33.85% to 66.15%.

References

External links
South Carolina Legislature - Senator James H. Ritchie, Jr. official SC Senate website
Project Vote Smart - Senator James H. Ritchie, Jr. (SC) profile
Follow the Money - James H. Ritchie Jr.
2006 2004 2002 2000 campaign contributions

South Carolina state senators
1961 births
Living people